Donald McCallum (born 1880) was a Scottish footballer who played as a defender.

References

External links
 LFC History profile

Scottish footballers
Liverpool F.C. players
1880 births
Year of death missing
Strathclyde F.C. players
Queen's Park F.C. players
Greenock Morton F.C. players
Sunderland A.F.C. players
Middlesbrough F.C. players
Port Glasgow Athletic F.C. players
Kilmarnock F.C. players
Renton F.C. players
Lochgelly United F.C. players
East Fife F.C. players
Footballers from Glasgow
Association football defenders